The 2009 Silver Helmet (BK) is the 2009 version of Silver Helmet organized by the Polish Motor Union (PZM). The final took place on 25 September in Częstochowa and was won by Grzegorz Zengota (Falubaz Zielona Góra).

Semi-final

Rzeszów 
 Semi-final 1
 6 August 2009
 Rzeszów
 Referee: Tomasz Proszowski (Tarnów)
 Attendance: 500
 Best time: 65.85 – Maciej Janowski in heat 7
 Qualify to the final: 8 + one reserve
Changes:
 (2) Patryk Pawlaszczyk (OST) → (17) Piekarski
 (4) Emil Idziorek (OST) → None
 (18) Maciej Michaluk (LUB) → None
 (19) Piotr Machnik (KRO) → None
 (20) Mateusz Łukaszewski (LES) → None

Grudziądz 
 Semi-final 2
 5 August 2009
 Grudziądz
 Referee: Grzegorz Sokołowski
 Attendance: 400
 Qualify to the Final: 8 + one reserve

No. 17 rode in Heat 3 (replaced No. 9), 16 (9), 19 (6)
No. 18 rode in Heat 7 (15), 18 (9), 20 (14)

The final 
 25 September 2009 (18:00 UTC+2)
 Częstochowa
 Referee: Józef Piekarski (Toruń)
Change:
(10) injury Przemysław Pawlicki (LES) → reserve no. 17

References 

2009
Helmet B